Wilson Stream is a meltwater stream which flows from the ice-free lower west slopes of Mount Bird, to the south of Alexander Hill, and over steep sea cliffs into Wohlschlag Bay, Ross Island. Mapped by the New Zealand Geological Survey Antarctic Expedition (NZGSAE), 1958–59, and named by the New Zealand Antarctic Place-Names Committee (NZ-APC) for J. Wilson, mountaineer assistant with the expedition.

Rivers of the Ross Dependency
Landforms of Ross Island